Ramón Domene Reyes (born 2 January 1990) is a Spanish cyclist who last rode for .

Major results

Road
2011
 6th Overall Vuelta a la Comunidad de Madrid Sub-23
2012
 1st  Under-23 National Road Race Championships

Track
2008
 3rd Omnium, Junior World Track Championships
2009
 3rd Team pursuit, Cali, World Cup

References

1990 births
Living people
Spanish male cyclists
People from Alto Vinalopó
Sportspeople from the Province of Alicante
Cyclists from the Valencian Community